Another Man's Poison is a 1951 British drama film directed by Irving Rapper and starring Bette Davis, Gary Merrill and Emlyn Williams. The screenplay by Val Guest is based on the play Deadlock by Leslie Sands.

Plot
Successful mystery novelist Janet Frobisher, who has been separated for years from her husband, a man with a criminal past, lives in an isolated home in Northern England. Her nearest neighbour is nosy vet, Dr Henderson. Janet has an affair with, and falls in love with, her secretary Chris's fiancé, Larry, who is years younger than she.

When her estranged husband unexpectedly appears, Janet poisons him by administering medication given to her by Dr Henderson for her horse. One of the deceased man's criminal cohorts arrives as she's preparing to dispose of the body in the local lake. When Janet's secretary and Larry arrive at the secluded house, the mysterious man, who has assisted her with her scheme, impersonates George, the long-absent husband of Janet.

George and Janet trade accusations and insults. Chris learns of Larry's affair with Janet, and determines to leave for London. Janet tries to convince Larry to stay with her, but he loves Chris and chases after her unsuccessfully. George shoots Janet's horse to upset her. Janet pretends she is remorseful about Larry and Chris, and sends George after Chris in an unsafe vehicle. He crashes, but survives.

The next morning the authorities are dragging the lake because of the crash. Janet's attempt to kill George has trapped them both, although George plans simply to run away. Janet tricks George into poisoning himself. As George dies, Dr Henderson arrives and says he knew all along that George was an imposter; the real George stopped by his house in the fog the night he arrived. Janet pretends to faint. Dr Henderson gives her a drink from the same flask she used to trick George. When she opens her eyes and recognises the flask, she realises she has killed herself, and bursts into hysterical laughter.

Principal cast
 Bette Davis as Janet Frobisher
 Gary Merrill as George Bates
 Emlyn Williams as Dr Henderson
 Anthony Steel as Larry Stevens
 Barbara Murray as Chris Dale
 Reginald Beckwith as Mr Bigley
 Edna Morris as Mrs Bunting

Production notes
It was based on the play Deadlock by Leslie Sands which premiered in 1948. It played in provincial theatres before being sold to the movies.

Val Guest, who wrote the script, said Barbara Stanwyck was envisioned in the lead role and was going to play it; however, she then discovered her husband Robert Taylor had been unfaithful making Quo Vadis and did not want to make the film.

In November 1950 producer Dan Angel announced Gloria Swanson would play the lead. However Swanson later dropped out; she said this was because she had received an offer to perform Twentieth Century on Broadway.

March 1951 Bette Davis and Gary Merrill were stars; Merrill replaced Leo Genn who had been cast. Merrill wrote in his memoirs that neither he nor Davis had particularly liked the script, but were attracted by the chance to work together in England, and by a large fee; Davis was also pleased by the fact the cast would include Emlyn Williams, who wrote the original play on which Davis' 1945 film The Corn Is Green was based.

This was the second on-screen pairing of then-married couple Davis and Gary Merrill, following All About Eve the previous year. They made Phone Call from a Stranger the following year. Rapper, who was selected by Davis to helm the film, had directed her in Now, Voyager ten years earlier.

Filming went from April to June 1951. Exteriors of the United Artists release were filmed on location in Malham, West Riding of Yorkshire (now in North Yorkshire), and interiors were shot at the Nettlefold Studios in Walton-on-Thames, Surrey. Davis was reportedly insecure and unhappy during filming. She called Steel "a beautiful prop".

Of the project, star Bette Davis recalled "We had nothing but script trouble. Gary (Merrill) and I often wondered why we agreed to make this film after we got started working on it. Emlyn (Williams) rewrote many scenes for us, which gave it some plausibility, but we never cured the basic ills of the story."

According to Merrill, "the basic premise" of the film "was pretty crummy to begin with. But Bette believed that with Emlyn's help the script could be improved. So the two of them went to work, altering this and that. When this happened I usually found a place to lie down, being my lazy self, to wait for the action to begin. The fact I wasn't doing anything bugged the hell out of Bette."

Critical reception
The New York Times described the film as "a garrulous but occasionally interesting excursion into murder and unrequited love...the script...is basically a static affair that rarely escapes from its sets or the scenarist's verbosity. Suspense is only fitfully generated and then quickly dissipated...Gary Merrill contributes a thoroughly seasoned and convincing portrayal...Emlyn Williams adds a professionally polished characterization...and Anthony Steel and Barbara Murray are adequate...However, Another Man's Poison is strictly Bette Davis' meat. She is permitted a wide latitude of histrionics in delineating the designing neurotic who is as flinty a killer as any we've seen in the recent past."

In his review in New Statesman and Nation, Frank Hauser wrote "No one has ever accused Bette Davis of failing to rise to a good script; what this film shows is how far she can go to meet a bad one."

References

Notes

External links
 
 
Another Man's Poison at BFI
Another Man's Poison at TCMDB

1951 films
1951 crime drama films
British crime drama films
1950s English-language films
British black-and-white films
British films based on plays
Films directed by Irving Rapper
Films shot at Nettlefold Studios
Films set in Yorkshire
Films scored by Paul Sawtell
1950s British films